Counties 3 Durham & Northumberland, previously known as Durham/Northumberland 3, is an English rugby union league at the ninth tier of the domestic competition and is currently the basement league of club rugby in North East England. Any club in the north east wishing to join the rugby union club hierarchy must begin at the bottom so all new teams from the north east start in this division - although until 2005-06 there was relegation to the now defunct Durham/Northumberland 4. The champions and runner-up are promoted to Counties 2 Durham & Northumberland.

Each season two teams from Durham/Northumberland 3 are picked to take part in the RFU Junior Vase (a national competition for clubs at levels 9-12) - one affiliated with the Durham County RFU, the other with the Northumberland RFU. Redcar won the league in 2020 with Seaham also promoted.

The division was split across two geographic areas (North & South) for the 2021–22 season as part of an RFU reorganisation of the Durham & Northumberland regional league.

Participating clubs 2022–23 
Blyth
Gosforth
DMP Elizabethans
Houghton Seaton Carew
Jarrovians
Prudhoe & Stockshill
Seghill
Yarm

Participating clubs 2021–22 

Jarrovians rejoined the (North) league having withdrawn from DN3 in 2019–20.

Ahead of the new season Newton Aycliffe RUFC (5th in 2019-20) and West Hartlepool T.D.S.O.B. (9th in 2019-20) withdrew from DN3 (South).

In November 2021 South Shields withdrew, meaning the (North) league was completed with 7 teams in 2021–22.

In January 2022 Richmondshire RUFC (10th in 2019-20) also withdrew, meaning the (South) league was completed with 4 teams in 2021–22.

The teams competing in 2021–22 achieved their places in the league based on performances in 2019–20, the positions in brackets refer to that season not 2020–21.

North

South

Season 2020–21

On 30 October 2020 the RFU announced  that due to the coronavirus pandemic a decision had been taken to cancel Adult Competitive Leagues (National League 1 and below) for the 2020/21 season meaning DN3 was not contested.

Participating clubs 2019–20

Original teams
When league rugby began in 1987 this division contained the following teams:

Billingham
Chester-le-Street
Darlington RA
Guisborough
Hartlepool TDSOB
North Shields
Seaton Carew
Washington
Wearside
Whitby

Durham/Northumberland 3 Honours

Durham/Northumberland 3 (1987–1993)

The original Durham/Northumberland 3 was a tier 11 league with promotion up to Durham/Northumberland 2 and relegation down to Durham/Northumberland 4 until the end of the 1991–92 season when that division was cancelled.

Durham/Northumberland 3 (1993–2000)

The creation of National 5 North for the 1993–94 season meant that Durham/Northumberland 3 dropped to being a tier 12 league.  A further restructure at the end of the 1995–96 season saw Durham/Northumberland 3 remain at tier 12.  The reintroduction of Durham/Northumberland 4, meant that relegation returned for the 1996–97 season.

Durham/Northumberland 3 (2000–present)

Northern league restructuring by the RFU at the end of the 1999–2000 season saw the cancellation of North East 1, North East 2 and North East 3 (tiers 7–9).  This meant that Durham/Northumberland 3 became a tier 9 league.  Relegation continued to Durham/Northumberland 4 until that division was abolished at the end of the 2005–06 season.

Number of league titles

Guisborough (4)
South Shields (4)
Barnard Castle (2)
Billingham (2)
Newton Aycliffe (2)
Seaton Carew (2)
Whitby (2)
Blyth (1)
Chester-le-Street (1)
Darlington Railway Athletic (1)
Gosforth (1)
Hartlepool (1)
Hartlepool B.B.O.B. (1)
Medicals (1)
North Shields (1)
Novocastrians (1)
Ponteland (1)
Prudhoe & Stocksfield (1)
Redcar (1)
Richmondshire (1)
Sunderland (1)
Wallsend (1)

See also
 Durham RFU
 Northumberland RFU
 English rugby union system
 Rugby union in England

Notes

References

9
Rugby union in Northumberland
Rugby union in County Durham